The Brightness is the third studio album by American folksinger Anaïs Mitchell, released February 13, 2007, on Righteous Babe Records.  It was recorded at The Bristmill in Bristol, Vermont and produced by Michael Chorney. In December 2012, the song 'Of a Friday Night' was played as the Weather on episode 12 of Welcome to Night Vale, "The Candidate", but was mislabeled as 'The Brightness'. "Hades and Persephone" was included in Mitchell's musical Hadestown, based on her studio album of the same name and retitled "How Long?"

Track listing 
 Your Fonder Heart
 Of a Friday Night
 Namesake
 Shenandoah
 Changer
 Song of the Magi
 Santa Fe Dream
 Hobo's Lullaby
 Old-Fashioned Hat
 Hades & Persephone
 Out of Pawn

References 

Anaïs Mitchell albums
2007 albums
Righteous Babe Records albums